The 1980 El Asnam earthquake occurred on October 10 at  with a moment magnitude of 7.1 and a maximum Mercalli intensity of X (Extreme). The shock occurred in the Algerian town of El Asnam (now known as Chlef). It was the largest earthquake in Algeria, and was followed three hours later by a magnitude 6.2 aftershock. No foreshocks were recorded. The earthquake was found to have occurred very close to the epicenter of the 1954 Chlef earthquake using joint epicenter determination techniques. It occurred at a previously unknown reverse fault.

The earthquake was the largest in the Atlas range since 1790.

In addition to the earthquake, weak tsunami waves were recorded on tide gauges.

The earthquake occurred at a populated region of Algeria, affecting 900,000 people. It destroyed 25,000 houses and made 300,000 inhabitants homeless. In addition to destroying homes, the earthquake also demolished critical infrastructure, including the main hospital, the central mosque, and a girls' school. Both events caused considerable damage with at least 2,633 killed and 8,369 injured. The earthquake caused approximately $5.2 billion in damage, which was 22% of Algeria's GDP at the time.

See also
 1954 Chlef earthquake
 List of earthquakes in 1980
 List of earthquakes in Algeria

Notes

External links

El Asnam Earthquake, 1980
El Asnam Earthquake, 1980
1980
October 1980 events in Africa
1980 disasters in Algeria